Convergence is a compilation album by Canadian industrial artist Front Line Assembly. This release contains all but two tracks from the Corrosion and Disorder releases, "The Wrack Part III - Wisdom", and "Aggression" respectively.  The latter would later be re-released on Corroded Disorder.

Track listing

 Tracks 1, 3–5, 11–13 from Corrosion.
 Tracks 2, 7, 8, 14 from Disorder.
 Tracks 6, 9, 10 previously unreleased.

Personnel

Front Line Assembly
 Bill Leeb – vocals, electronic instruments, mixing (2, 5, 8, 11–13)
 Michael Balch – electronic instruments, mixing (2, 5, 6, 8–13)

Technical personnel
 Dave Ogilvie – mixing (1, 3, 4, 7, 14)

References

Front Line Assembly compilation albums
1988 albums
Wax Trax! Records albums
Third Mind Records compilation albums